"All Downhill from Here" is the first single from New Found Glory's fourth studio album, Catalyst. The song helped the album springboard the band's success. "All Downhill from Here" was released to radio on April 6, 2004.

The single peaked at number 11 on Billboard's Modern Rock Tracks.

Music video
The music video for the song was created in cooperation with a group of French animators who worked on creating a unique environment of creatures. The video was co-directed by the animation team and Meiert Avis. In the video, the creatures are seen building a  structure. The band is featured in the video on a platform playing while gradually rising. As they continue to rise, they eventually reach a representation of heaven before the platform drops. A creature runs through some of the supports and the structure collapses. When the music video for this song aired on MTV's Total Request Live, fans voted it on the show fifty days in a row, eventually leading to the video's retirement on the program.

Charts

Weekly charts

Track listing
The enhanced version of this single features four tracks.

 "All Downhill from Here"
 "Broken Sound" (Radio Session)
 "The Minute I Met You"
 "All Downhill from Here" (CD-ROM track)

References

2004 singles
New Found Glory songs
Music videos directed by Meiert Avis
Songs written by Chad Gilbert
Melodic hardcore songs
2004 songs
Geffen Records singles
Song recordings produced by Neal Avron